Gareth Armstrong is a Scottish footballer who plays for Auchinleck Talbot.

He previously played for Ayr United and Troon.

Career

Ayr United
A member of Ayr United's football academy, Armstrong made his first team debut in the Scottish Second Division as a substitute on 7 May 2011 against Brechin City at Glebe Park. Ayr United won promotion via the playoffs and he made his Scottish First Division debut on the opening day of the 2011–12 season.

Troon
Armstrong moved into Junior football with Troon to gain experience of regular first-team football after a long education with Ayr United. His versatility has seen him used at right-back, centre-back & midfield. He won the Player of the Year award in season 2012–13 playing at left-back and has been most consistently used there since.

Auchinleck Talbot 
Armstrong signed for Auchinleck Talbot in July 2017.

Career statistics

References

1993 births
Living people
Ayr United F.C. players
Troon F.C. players
Scottish Football League players
Scottish footballers
Scottish Junior Football Association players
Association football defenders
Auchinleck Talbot F.C. players
West of Scotland Football League players